Joonas Olkkonen (born 19 February 1976 in Kärkölä) is a Finnish sport shooter. He claimed the bronze medal in double trap shooting when his birthplace Lahti hosted the 2002 ISSF World Shooting Championships, and was selected to compete for Finland at the 2004 Summer Olympics, finishing last out of twenty-five prospective shooters. Having pursued the sport since the age of thirteen, Olkkonen trained full-time for Lahti Shooting Club in Lahti under his personal coach Kari Olin.

Olkkonen qualified for the Finnish squad in the men's double trap at the 2004 Summer Olympics in Athens, by having registered a minimum qualifying score of 140 and obtaining the bronze medal to ensure an Olympic slot from the World Championships two years earlier. Olkkonen fired 118 out of 150 birds to round out the leaderboard in last place from a field of twenty-five shooters, failing to advance to the final round.

References

External links

1976 births
Living people
Finnish male sport shooters
Olympic shooters of Finland
Shooters at the 2004 Summer Olympics
People from Kärkölä
Sportspeople from Päijät-Häme